Druzhny ("Friendly") was a Project 1135 Burevestnik-class Large Anti-Submarine Ship (BPK) or Krivak-class frigate. Launched on 22 January 1975, the vessel served with the Soviet Navy until it was dissolved and then was transferred to the Russian Navy. After being retired on 10 April 2002, there was an unsuccessful attempt to refit the warship as a shopping and leisure facility, but instead the vessel was scrapped.

Design and development

Development
Druzhny was a Project 1135 Large Anti-Submarine Ship (BPK), one of twenty one that were launched in the 1970s. Designed by N.P. Sobolov, the vessel served with the Soviet Navy, and the Russian Navy after the dissolution of the Soviet Union, as an anti-submarine frigate. The ship was designated a Guard Ship (SKR) from 28 July 1977.

Design
A complement of 180, including 22 officers, was carried.

Armament
Druzhny was designed for anti-submarine warfare around four URPK-4 Metel missiles (NATO reporting name SS-N-14 'Silex'), backed up by  torpedoes and a pair of RBU-6000  anti-submarine rocket launchers. The missiles were upgraded to URPK-5 as part of a major repair and modernisation undertaken between  1 July 1988 and 21 January 1992. Defence against aircraft was provided by forty 4K33 OSA-M (SA-N-4'Gecko') surface to air missiles which were launched from four ZIF-122 launchers. Two twin  AK-726 guns were mounted aft. Mines were also carried, either eighteen IGDM-500 KSM, fourteen KAM, fourteen KB Krab, ten Serpey, four PMR-1, seven PMR-2, seven MTPK-1, fourteen RM-1 mines or twelve UDM-2.

The ship had a well-equipped sensor suite, including a single MR-310A Angara-A air/surface search radar, Volga navigation radar, Don navigation radar, MP-401S Start-S ESM radar system, Nickel-KM and Khrom-KM IFF and ARP-50R radio direction finder. An extensive sonar complement was fitted, including MG-332 Titan-2, MG-325 Vega and MGS-400K, along with two MG-7 Braslet anti-saboteur sonars and the MG-26 Hosta underwater communication system. The PK-16 ship-borne decoy dispenser system was fitted, initially with 128 AZ-TST-60 rounds, later upgraded to AZ-TSP-60UM from 1991 and AZ-TSTM-60U from 1994.

Construction and service

Construction
Druzhny was the eighth Project 1135 ship built by Yantar and was laid down in Kaliningrad on 12 December 1973 with yard number 158. The vessel was launched on 22 January 1975 and commissioned on 30 September later that year.

Service
Druzhny was initially assigned to the Pacific Fleet. Redeployed to the Baltic Fleet on 25 October 1975 as part of the 128th Brigate, the ship undertook a number of international visits including Gothenburg, Sweden, in August 1978, Rostock, East Germany, in October 1979, Helsinki, Finland, in August 1981, Tunis, Tunisia, in May 1983 and Cadiz, Spain, in June 1993.

After twenty seven years service, Druzhny was decommissioned on 10 April 2002. The ship was rescued from scrapping with a plan to be converted, by Project 1135MK, into a shopping and entertainment complex, but the project was not completed and the ship was scrapped in 2016.

Selected Pennant numbers

References

Citations

Bibliography

External links

Ships built in the Soviet Union
1975 ships
Krivak-class frigates